Cynthia M. Gorton ( Roberts; pen name, Ida Glenwood; February 27, 1826 - August 10, 1894) was a blind 19th-century American poet and author. For 20 years, Gorton lectured on behalf of the temperance movement.

Early life and education
Cynthia M. Roberts was born on the summit of one of the highest hills of Great Barrington, Massachusetts, February 27, 1826. She lived in a humble home with her poor and religious parents. Her father, Samuel Roberts, died when she was one year old. She was the youngest of a family of five children, and sometimes lived with family and friends to aid Roberts' widowed mother.

Roberts began writing poetry as a child, and was reportedly reserved and isolated from other children.

Roberts' mother passed away when Roberts was 14 and a pupil in the Emma Willard School, in Troy, New York. She was solicited, by the preceptress, after her mother's death to continue her studies as a "teacher-scholar," but the state of her eyes would not permit it.

Career
At the age of 21, Roberts married Fred Gorton, a wealthy paper manufacturer. Six years later, during a long illness, she became completely blind. She became dependent on others to transcribe her thoughts to paper.

Roberts' first prose work, The Fatal Secret, was written wholly with a pencil, but so rapidly did she do this that her hand, all unconsciously to herself, formed an almost new alphabet, unreadable except by those who had followed the transformation. Roberts began using a typewriter for her writing shortly thereafter. 

Roberts published two books and was widely known by her pen name "Ida Glenwood." She was also sometimes called " The Sweet Singer" and "The Blind Bard of Michigan."

Roberts' first published poem appeared in the Philadelphia Inquirer, the editor, Mr. Harding, having reportedly accidentally seen it in her husband's office. She wrote many serials, stories and poems for the Detroit "Christian Herald" and other papers and periodicals. These included The Fatal Secret, or a Romance of Mackinac Island, Kate Wynans and the Forger's Daughter, Ma Belle Queen, The Mistress of Rosedale, Tangled Threads, Black France, and others.

Roberts was also involved in the temperance movement, presiding at public meetings, lecturing and reciting original poems. Her short career as a platform speaker began with the recitation of a poem entitled Adolphus and Olivia, or a tale of Kansas. Her oratorical powers were unusual, and her remarkable memory enabled her to recite for 1.5 hours a poem of historical and tragic interest. Of this Gov. Reuben Fenton said, at its second rehearsal, "One must conclude, after listening to 'The Blind Bard of Michigan,' that if we would find the best and deepest poetical thoughts, we must look for them in the emanations from the imprisoned soul." For 20 years, Gorton lectured many times before large and enthusiastic audiences finally relinquishing her speaking engagements because of exhaustion.

Becoming an expert with the typewriter, she was a prolific letter writer to "shut-ins," who belonged to the various societies where she was a member.

Personal life
Gorton lived in Fenton, Michigan, where she died on August 10, 1894, aged 68.  She was buried in Oakwood Cemetery, Fenton.

Selected works
 Fatal secret, 1873
 The wife's appeal: a poem, 1873
 Lily Pearl and the Mistress of Rosedale, 1892

References

Attribution

Bibliography

External links
 
 
 Select poems by Cynthia M. Roberts Gorton at The Magazine of Poetry

1826 births
1894 deaths
19th-century American women writers
19th-century American poets
American women poets
Blind writers
American blind people
People from Great Barrington, Massachusetts
Writers from Massachusetts
Emma Willard School alumni
Wikipedia articles incorporating text from A Woman of the Century